The following elections occurred in the 18th century, between the years 1701 and 1800.

1700s 

January 1701 English general election
November 1701 English general election
1702 English general election
1702 Scottish general election
1705 English general election
1707 British general election
1708 British general election

1710s 
 1710 British general election
 1713 British general election
 1715 British general election

1720s 
 1721 Papal conclave
 1722 British general election
1724 papal conclave
 1727 British general election

1730s 
 1730 papal conclave
1734 British general election

1740s 
 1740 papal conclave
1741 British general election
 1747 British general election

1750s 
 1754 British general election
 1754 Oxfordshire election
 1758 Papal conclave

1760s 
 1761 British general election
 1768 British general election
 1769 Papal conclave

1770s 
 1774 British general election
 1774–1775 Papal conclave
 1777 New York gubernatorial election

1780s 

 1780 British general election
 1780 New York gubernatorial election
 1783 New York gubernatorial election
 1783 Irish general election
 1784 British general election
 1786 New York gubernatorial election
 1786 Polish-Lithuanian legislative election
 Great Britain by-elections
 1788 Polish-Lithuanian legislative election
 United States House of Representatives elections in South Carolina, 1788
 1788 United States presidential election
 1788 United States Senate elections
 Estates General of 1789
 1789 New York gubernatorial election
 United States House of Representatives elections in New York, 1789
 1789 United States House of Representatives elections
 1789 United States presidential election
 United States Senate election in New York, 1789

1790s 
 1790 Polish-Lithuanian legislative election
 1790 British general election
 United States House of Representatives elections in New York, 1790
 1790 United States House of Representatives elections
 1790 United States Senate elections
 1791 French legislative election
 United States Senate election in New York, 1791
 1792 New York gubernatorial election
 1792 United States House of Representatives elections
 1792 United States presidential election
 1792 United States Senate elections
 1792 French National Convention election
 United States House of Representatives elections in New York, 1793
 1793 Polish-Lithuanian legislative election
 United States House of Representatives elections in New York, 1794
 1794 United States House of Representatives elections
 1794 United States Senate elections
 1795 French Directory election
 1795 New York gubernatorial election
 United States Senate election in New York, 1795
 1796 British general election
 United States House of Representatives elections in New York, 1796
 1796 and 1797 United States House of Representatives elections
 1796 United States presidential election
 1796 and 1797 United States Senate elections
 United States Senate special election in New York, 1796
 United States Senate election in New York, 1797
 1798 French Directory election
 1798 New York gubernatorial election
 United States House of Representatives elections in New York, 1798
 1798 and 1799 United States House of Representatives elections
 1798 and 1799 United States Senate elections
 United States Senate special election in New York, August 1798
 United States Senate special election in New York, January 1798
 1798–1799 United States House of Representatives elections in Massachusetts
 1799 French legislative election
 1799 Pennsylvania gubernatorial election
 1799 Tennessee gubernatorial election
 1799 New Hampshire gubernatorial election
 1799 New York's 1st congressional district special election
 1799 United States House of Representatives elections in Virginia
 1799 New Hampshire's at-large congressional district special election
 1799 Vermont gubernatorial election
 1799–1800 Papal conclave

1800 
 United States House of Representatives elections in New York, 1800
 1800 and 1801 United States House of Representatives elections
 1800 United States presidential election
 1800 and 1801 United States Senate elections
 United States Senate special election in New York, April 1800
 United States Senate special election in New York, November 1800

1701-1800